The 2002 Craven District Council election took place on 2 May 2002 to elect members of Craven District Council in North Yorkshire, England. The whole council was up for election with boundary changes since the last election in 2000 reducing the number of seats by 4. The council stayed under no overall control.

Background
Before the election the Conservatives had exactly half of the seats on the council with 17 councillors, compared to 12 Independents and 5 Liberal Democrats. Due to boundary changes, which reduced the number of seats on the council from 34 to 30, the whole council was elected for the first time since 1974, instead of the usual one-third of the council being elected at each election.

A total of 61 candidates stood for the 30 seats contested, comprising 23 Conservatives, 18 independents, 13 Liberal Democrats and 1 candidate from the Labour Party. 3 Conservative and 3 independent candidates were elected unopposed.

Election result
The Conservatives won the most seats to have 13 councillors but without a majority. The Liberal Democrats made gains to have 9 seats, while independents took 8 seats.

Ward results

References

2002
2002 English local elections
2000s in North Yorkshire